UPT and Upt can stand for:

 United Paramount Theaters
 Universal Personal Telecommunications
 University of Pittsburgh at Titusville
 Unlimited Paenga Tawhiti, secondary school in Christchurch City, New Zealand
 Unpenttrium, a hypothetical chemical element in the extended periodic table with the temporary symbol Upt
 Upper Palatinate Tower, an observation tower
 Uptown New Orleans
 UK railway stations – U in the UK
 Universitatea Politehnica, din Timişoara (Polytechnic University of Timișoara), Romania
 Universidade Portucalense Infante D. Henrique (UPT), Portugal